Lia Roberts (born Lia Sandu on May 7, 1949) is a Romanian and American politician. The former leader of the Nevada Republican Party, she expressed an intention to run in the Romanian election of 2004, but withdrew due to poor poll numbers.

Born in Bucharest, she emigrated from Communist Romania in 1979, later becoming a naturalized American citizen. She lives in Las Vegas, where she serves as honorary consul for the Romanian Consulate.

References

Diplomats from Bucharest
Romanian emigrants to the United States
Politicians from Bucharest
1949 births
Living people
Women in Nevada politics
Nevada Republicans
Romanian women diplomats
21st-century American women